Dziwnów  (formerly ) is a town in north-western Poland situated on the Baltic Sea at the mouth of the river Dziwna which divides it into the right-bank part containing the center of the town, belonging to historical Farther Pomerania, while the left-bank part is located in Western Pomerania, with both parts connected through a bascule bridge. It is a part and the seat of the eponymous Dziwnów municipality within Kamień County, West Pomeranian Voivodeship. As of December 2021, the town has a population of 2,595.

History

The battle at Julin Bridge took place nearby in 1170, but the oldest known mention of the village dates back to 1243. It remained a small fishing village until the 19th century, when it began to transform into a holiday resort. At the end of the 19th century, salt springs were discovered, and the first sanatorium was established. In the 1930s, military barracks were built. During World War II, in June 1944, Americans conducted air raids on the German garrison in the village. The historic church was destroyed in the final stages of the war. At the end of World War II, Polish troops entered the village in May 1945. The German population was subsequently expelled and replaced by Polish settlers.

In 1949 and 1950 in the local garrison there was a military hospital for Greeks and Macedonians wounded in the Greek Civil War. In total, around 2,000 people were treated there. Later on, in the 1950s, the hospital staff co-created the Military Medical Academy in Łódź. In 1958 Dziwnów was granted urban-type settlement status and afterwards a port was built. The development of the settlement in the following decades led to the granting of municipal rights in 2004. From 1964 to 1986, the 1st Assault Battalion, which was considered one of the best trained units in the history of the Polish Army, was stationed in Dziwnów.

International relations

Dziwnów is twinned with:
 Gorzów Wielkopolski, Poland (2014)
 Sosnowiec, Poland (2013)
 Werneuchen, Germany (1993)

Gallery

References

External links

 Official town website
 Tourist town website

Cities and towns in West Pomeranian Voivodeship
Kamień County